A complex space is a mathematical space based upon complex numbers. Types of complex space include:

Complex affine space, an affine space over the complex numbers, with no distinguishable point of origin
Complex analytic space, a generalization of a complex manifold, with singularities allowed
Complex coordinate space, the set of all ordered n-tuples of complex numbers
Complex Hilbert space, a complex inner product space that is also a complete metric space
Complex manifold, in differential geometry, a manifold with an atlas of charts to the open unit disk such that the transition maps are holomorphic
Complex projective space, a projective space with respect to the field of complex numbers
Unitary space, a vector space with the addition of an inner-product structure
Complex vector space, a vector space whose scalar field is the complex numbers